Hansron is a small village located close to Nawanshahr within the Indian state of Punjab.  It has a population of 1363 with around 262 households.

References

Villages in Shaheed Bhagat Singh Nagar district